Pil Joong Lee is a cryptographer at Pohang University of Science and Technology (POSTECH), South Korea.

Lee earned his B.S. and M.S. from the Seoul National University (Seoul, South Korea) in 1974 and 1977, respectively, and then later his Ph.D. from UCLA (Los Angeles, California, United States) in 1985.

References

External links 
 Official homepage
 

Year of birth missing (living people)
Living people
Seoul National University alumni
University of California, Los Angeles alumni
Academic staff of Pohang University of Science and Technology
South Korean computer scientists